The women's 100 metre backstroke S2 event at the 2016 Paralympic Games took place on 9 September 2016, at the Olympic Aquatics Stadium. No heats were held.

Final 
17:49 9 September 2016:

Notes

Swimming at the 2016 Summer Paralympics